is a Japanese musician. He plays bass guitar in the band Mr. Children.

Early life
He attended Komae Daini Junior High School in Tokyo, where he met the other future band members Kenichi Tahara and Hideya Suzuki.

References

External links
 Discogs
 Apple Music
 Yahoo News (in Japanese)

Living people
People from Nagasaki
Year of birth missing (living people)